Alphonsus may refer to:

As a given name
Any of a number of rulers named Alfonso
Alphonsus J. Donlon (1867–1923), American Jesuit
 Alphonsus Liguori (1696–1787), Roman Catholic Saint
 Alphonsus Liguori Penney (born 1924), Canadian Roman Catholic priest
 Alphonsus Rodriguez (1532–1617), Spanish Jesuit
 Alphonsus a Sancta Maria (1396–1456), Spanish historian
 Alphonsus de Guimaraens (1870—1921), Brazilian poet
 Alphonsus Cassell (1949–2010), Montserratian calypso and soca musician

as a surname:
Petrus Alphonsi (or Petrus Alfonsus) (1062–1110), Spanish Jewish writer

other:
Alphonsus (crater) lunar crater